Marcellus is a town in Onondaga County, New York, United States. The population was 6,210 at the 2010 census. The town was probably named after Marcus Claudius Marcellus, a Roman general, by a clerk interested in the Classics.

The Marcellus Formation is a vast geological layer of shale spanning Pennsylvania, West Virginia and parts of other states and Ontario, which is named for an outcropping in or near Marcellus.

The Town of Marcellus contains a village also named Marcellus.  The town and village are southwest of Syracuse.

Geography
According to the United States Census Bureau, the town has a total area of 32.7 square miles (84.6 km2), of which 32.5 square miles (84.3 km2)  is land and 0.1 square mile (0.3 km2)  (0.40%) is water.

US Route 20 is an east–west highway through the southern part of the town.
New York State Route 175 is an east–west highway and intersects New York State Route 174 at Marcellus village.

Marcellus is at the eastern end of the Finger Lakes District and is at the northern end of Otisco Lake.  High hills, deep valleys, lake and streams, make the town remarkably scenic.  Nine Mile Creek is a noted trout stream where New York State provides several access areas. Marcellus Park, which was once an Onondaga County Park, was taken over by the Town of Marcellus in 1993. The village of Marcellus is one of 15 villages in Onondaga County. Baltimore Woods Nature Center  is nearby.

History
The territory was part of the lands of the Onondaga tribe. Marcellus was a named township in the former Central New York Military Tract. It was first settled by outsiders circa 1794.

The town was formed in 1794; the Town of Geddes was removed in 1798. The township of Camillus was taken off in 1799. Otisco was removed in 1806. In 1830, the western part of the town was used for the new Town of Skaneateles. Marcellus regained territory in 1840 from Spafford and Otisco.

The Tefft-Steadman House was listed on the National Register of Historic Places in 2007.

Demographics

As of the census of 2000, there were 6,319 people, 2,378 households, and 1,773 families residing in the town.  The population density was 194.1 people per square mile (75.0/km2).  There were 2,488 housing units at an average density of 76.4 per square mile (29.5/km2).  The racial makeup of the town was 98.31% White, 0.41% Black or African American, 0.30% Native American, 0.22% Asian, 0.02% Pacific Islander, 0.06% from other races, and 0.68% from two or more races. Hispanic or Latino of any race were 0.84% of the population.

There were 2,378 households, out of which 37.1% had children under the age of 18 living with them, 63.3% were married couples living together, 8.0% had a female householder with no husband present, and 25.4% were non-families. 22.3% of all households were made up of individuals, and 9.5% had someone living alone who was 65 years of age or older.  The average household size was 2.66 and the average family size was 3.14.

In the town, the population was spread out, with 28.2% under the age of 18, 6.0% from 18 to 24, 27.0% from 25 to 44, 25.6% from 45 to 64, and 13.2% who were 65 years of age or older.  The median age was 39 years. For every 100 females, there were 95.3 males.  For every 100 females age 18 and over, there were 92.7 males.

The median income for a household in the town was $51,881, and the median income for a family was $58,188. Males had a median income of $40,541 versus $32,234 for females. The per capita income for the town was $25,628.  About 2.5% of families and 3.2% of the population were below the poverty line, including 3.9% of those under age 18 and 0.5% of those age 65 or over.

Communities in the Town of Marcellus
 Clintonville – A hamlet in the southwestern part of the town on US-20.
 Marcellus – The Village of Marcellus is at the junction of NY-174 and NY-175.
 Marcellus Falls – A hamlet north of Marcellus village on NY-174, located at the northern town line.
 Marietta – A hamlet north of Otisco Lake on NY-174.
 Pumpkin Hollow – A valley at the eastern town line.
 Rose Hill – A hamlet west of Marietta.
 Shamrock A hamlet near the western town line, west of Marietta.
 Thorn Hill – A hamlet southwest of Marietta by the southern town line.
 Sage Meadows- A hamlet near the northeastern town line.

References

External links
 Weekly Newspaper
  Marcellus Town & Village Web Site
 USGenWeb Page: Marcellus, Onondaga County, New York

Syracuse metropolitan area
Towns in Onondaga County, New York